Occupational dust exposure can occur in various settings, including agriculture, forestry, and mining. Dust hazards include those that arise from handling grain and cotton, as well as from mining coal. Wood dust, commonly referred to as "sawdust", is another occupational dust hazard that can pose a risk to workers' health.

Without proper safety precautions, dust exposure can lead to occupational lung diseases.

Dust particles are generated by the disturbance/agitation of rock/mineral, dry grain, timber, or fiber material. The particles generated can range in size from 1μm to 100μm, and can "become airborne depending on their origin, physical characteristics and ambient conditions."

Examples 
Types of dust present in the occupational setting include:

 Rock/mineral dusts
 Metallic dusts
 Chemical dusts
 Grain and produce dusts
 Molds and spores

Occupations

Mining 
During various mining processes in which rock/minerals are broken up and collected for processing, mineral dusts are created and become airborne. Inhalation of these dusts can lead to various respiratory illnesses, depending on the dust type (e.g. coal, silica, etc.), size of the dust particulates, and exposure duration.

Forestry 
During the stages of wood processing, wood dust is generated. 'Wood dust' is "any wood particle arising from the processing or handling of woods." Sawing, routing, sanding, among other activities, form wood dust, which can then become airborne during the process of dust removal from furniture, maintenance, or equipment cleanup.

Agriculture 
Dust generated from milling, handling and storage of grains or fibers can pose a threat to workers' health. During the milling process, solid agricultural grains (corn, barley, wheat, cotton etc.) may undergo crushing, grinding, or granulation. This process generates agricultural dust. Improperly handling grains can also expose workers to grain dusts. Grain storage can also present hazards to workers. Storage structures can create dangerous conditions due to gases emitted from spoiled grains and chemical fumes. "Workers may be exposed to unhealthy levels of airborne contaminants, including molds, chemical fumigants (toxic chemicals), and gases associated with decaying and fermenting silage."

Construction 
Crystalline silica is a typical mineral found in the earth's outside layer. Materials like sand, stone, cement, and mortar that contains Crystalline silica. It is likewise used to make items like glass, stoneware, earthenware production, blocks, and counterfeit stone. Respirable Crystalline silica – exceptionally little particles at any rate multiple times less than conventional sand you may discover on sea shores and jungle gyms – is made when cutting, sawing, granulating, boring, and squashing stone, rock, solid, block, square, and mortar. Exercises, for example, rough impacting with sand; sawing block or cement; sanding or penetrating into solid dividers; granulating mortar; fabricating block, solid squares, stone ledges, or clay items; and cutting or pulverizing stone outcome in laborer openings to respirable translucent silica dust. Modern sand utilized in specific activities, for example, foundry work and water powered cracking (deep oil drilling), is likewise a wellspring of respirable Crystalline silica openness. About 2.3 million individuals in the U.S. are exposed to silica at work.

Laborers who breathe in these little translucent silica particles are at expanded danger of creating genuine silica-related infections, not limited to but including:

 Silicosis, a serious lung sickness that can prompt inability and demise;
 Lung cancer;
 Constant obstructive pulmonary disease (COPD); and
 Kidney infection.

Steel industry 
According to the Worldsteel Association, the steel industry employs more than 6 million people worldwide. China in 2018, reported being the world's largest producer of steel with 928.3 million tons of steel produced. Steel is a versatile material, the uses range from the automotive industry to the medical industry. Almost every aspect of our lives involves the use of steel in some form. Steel is mostly made of iron, less than 2% of steel is made of carbon and 1% of steel is manganese, there are also small traces of silicon, phosphorus, sulfur, and oxygen found in steel as well.

With more than 6 million people working in the steel industry around the world, these employees have the potential to be exposed to particulate matter from the dust. Since the dust from steel manufacturing of the steel products are done indoors this can lead to the buildup of dust which can be inhaled by employees. An increase of dust levels have had negative health effects on employees as found in their serum protein levels, respiratory, and airway health. Welders, for example, are one of the many steel workers exposed to dust or particles from the steel industry. Since steel is composed of manganese, steel workers have been found to be exposed to high levels of particles containing manganese. If manganese is found at high levels of exposure, can be neurotoxic to the individual(s). The buildup of these particles can accumulate in the brain and produce symptoms such as tremors, body rigidness, reduces the sense of smell and impairs motor function as well as balance. Alzheimer's disease has also been found as a result of exposure to high levels of manganese.  Although, a link to Alzheimer's in welders has been found. It has been found that welders exposed to dust via inhalation have had serum level changes which relate to neurologic disease. An increase in 5 neurology-related proteins were found (GCSF, EFNA4, CTSS, CLM6, VEC2) in welder's blood. Constant changes in neurology-related proteins could result in an increased risk for future disease.

Long term exposure to dust particles containing metallic compounds have been found to impair pulmonary surfactant and lung function which then results in chronic respiratory diseases.  There have also been findings of eye irritation from the dust in steel manufacturing. The following preemptive measures can be taken to reduced ones exposure to dust particulates; increasing the ventilation systems inside the industries, wearing personal protective gear such as eyeglasses and masks as well as, washing hands to prevent other dermal or intestinal exposures.

Health, safety, and epidemiology 
Exposure to occupational dusts poses many hazards to workers' health and safety. Large, airborne dust particles can obscure vision, limit mobility while on the ground, and interfere with proper machine/equipment functioning. Characteristics of dust particles such as size and chemical qualities can determine the location and effects of the dust particles on the respiratory system.

Lung diseases 
Illnesses/Diseases that can develop due to exposure to dust in the workplace.

 Hypersensitivity Pneumonitis
 Occupational Asthma
 COPD (Bronchitis, Emphysema)
 Pneumoconiosis (Coal Workers' Pneumoconiosis, Asbestosis, Silicosis)
 Mycobacterial Infections

Safety 
Workplace facilities have in place safety protocol and regulations to ensure that exposure to dust/particulate matter is minimal to non-existent. Barring the elimination or substitution of the hazard, controls on the engineering and administrative levels act to protect workers from dust hazards. Personal protective equipment (PPE) is used by workers to prevent specific exposure to the hazard.

To mitigate exposure to dust in the workplace, respirators, ventilators, and eye protection are measures often employed. Operators can take additional precautions by implementing dust suppression solutions. Equipment such as dust collectors and dust suppression cannons are effective ways to prevent fugitive dust from becoming airborne, helping create safer environments for employees and the surrounding community.

See also 
 Pneumoconiosis
 Organic dust toxic syndrome
 Occupational hazards associated with exposure to human nail dust
 Occupational safety and health
 Agricultural safety and health
 Mine safety
 Hierarchy of hazard controls

References 

Occupational safety and health
Dust
Respiratory agents